Tara MacLean Sweeney (born July 28, 1973) is an Iñupiaq American businesswoman and former government official who served as assistant secretary of the interior for Native American affairs from July 2018 to January 2021. Sweeney previously served in Alaska Governor Frank Murkowski's cabinet.

Early life and education
A daughter of Bryan MacLean, a teacher, and Eileen MacLean (née Panigeo), who served as a Democratic member of the Alaska Legislature. Of Iñupiaq descent, she is a member of the Native Village of Barrow Inupiat Traditional Government. One of her ancestors translated the Bible into the Inupiaq language.

Sweeney grew up in the towns of Wainwright, Bethel, Unalakleet, Utqiagvik in rural Alaska.  In 1991, she graduated from Barrow High School. Sweeney attended Cornell University, where she received a Bachelor of Science degree in industrial and labor relations in 1998.

Career

Business career in Alaska 

For almost two decades she has worked for Arctic Slope Regional Corporation (ASRC) with subsidiaries, in various positions, the last being as Executive Vice President of External Affair where she served as the company's spokesperson. In this capacity, she has advocated for opening the Arctic National Wildlife Refuge for oil drilling. She has a birthright co-ownership in the company.

She started a one-year term as co-chair of the Alaska Federation of Natives in October 2013. From 2015 to 2017, Sweeney served as chair of the Arctic Economic Council as a representative of the Inuit Circumpolar Council.

Political activity 
In 2003, Sweeney joined the cabinet of Alaska Governor Frank Murkowski as Special Assistant for Rural Affairs and Education.

During the 2014 United States Senate election in Alaska, Sweeney served as co-chair of Republican Dan Sullivan's Senate campaign, stating that the Democratic Senate Majority "feverishly worked on an agenda that stifled growth and economic opportunities in Alaska". As Assistant Secretary, Sweeney wrote an op-ed endorsing Sullivan's reelection in 2020, arguing that Sullivan's opponent Al Gross supported "national Democrats' own radical, anti-Alaska agenda".

In 2022, Sweeney announced her run for Alaska's at-large congressional district special election after the death of Don Young. In June, she finished fifth in the 50-person at-large primary, with the top four advancing to a runoff. When the third-placer, Independent Al Gross dropped out, the question of her moving to fourth arose. A case for her inclusion brought by her supporters lost and she did not protest her elimination. Sweeney announced a week after the primary election she was suspending her campaign after not "seeing a path to victory."

Bureau of Indian Affairs 
In October 2017, Sweeney was nominated by President Donald Trump as assistant secretary for Indian affairs. The Senate Committee on Indian Affairs unanimously recommended a full vote in the Senate, and she was unanimously confirmed in June 2018. During her confirmation hearing, she pledged to recuse herself from issues involving the Arctic Slope Regional Corporation. She is the first Alaska Native and second woman to oversee the Bureau of Indian Affairs.

As Assistant Secretary, she faced calls for her resignation over the inclusion of for-profit Alaska Native owned corporations to directly compete with funding set aside for native governments dealing with the COVID-19 crisis. On April 28, 2020 a federal court blocked the inclusion of Alaska Native owned corporations from receiving federal stimulus money earmarked for tribal governments.  The Supreme Court head the case on appeal and reversed the lower courts decision, agreeing that the 12 Alaska Native Regional Corporations were indeed eligible for the CARES Act funding along with the tribes.

Personal life 
Sweeney is married to Kevin Sweeney, a former aide to Senator Lisa Murkowski. The couple have two children and live in Anchorage. She had a role in the 2011 film On the Ice, and their son Ahmaogak had a role in the 2012 film Big Miracle.

References

External links
 

1973 births
20th-century American businesswomen
20th-century American businesspeople
20th-century Native American women
20th-century Native Americans
21st-century American businesswomen
21st-century American businesspeople
21st-century American women politicians
21st-century Native American politicians
21st-century Native American women
Alaska Republicans
Businesspeople from Alaska
Candidates in the 2022 United States House of Representatives elections
Cornell University alumni
Inupiat people
Living people
Native American women in politics
People from Utqiagvik, Alaska
Trump administration personnel
United States Bureau of Indian Affairs personnel
21st-century American politicians